Annamária Tóth (née Kovács, born 14 September 1945 in Budapest) is a Hungarian athlete who competed in various disciplines.

Achievements
She competed for Hungary in the 1968 Summer Olympics held in Mexico City, Mexico and won the bronze medal in the pentathlon.

She also won nine Hungarian Championships between 1966 and 1969 in the 100 and 200 meter sprints, the 100 meter hurdles, long jump and pentathlon.

She was named Hungarian Sportswoman of The Year in 1967.

References

External links
 

1945 births
Living people
Hungarian heptathletes
Athletes (track and field) at the 1968 Summer Olympics
Olympic athletes of Hungary
Olympic bronze medalists for Hungary
Medalists at the 1968 Summer Olympics
Olympic bronze medalists in athletics (track and field)
Universiade medalists in athletics (track and field)
Universiade silver medalists for Hungary
Athletes from Budapest
Medalists at the 1965 Summer Universiade